The 1989 European Open was a women's tennis tournament played on outdoor clay courts at the Drizia-Miremont Tennis Club in Geneva, Switzerland that was part of the Category 2 tier of the 1989 WTA Tour. The tournament was held from 22 May until 28 May 1989. Third-seeded Manuela Maleeva won the singles title.

Finals

Singles

 Manuela Maleeva defeated  Conchita Martínez 6–4, 6–0
 It was Maleeva's 2nd title of the year and the 14th of her career.

Doubles

 Katrina Adams /  Lori McNeil defeated  Larisa Savchenko /  Natasha Zvereva 2–6, 6–3, 6–4
 It was Adams' 4th title of the year and the 8th of her career. It was McNeil's 2nd title of the year and the 20th of her career.

References

External links
 ITF tournament edition details
 Tournament draws

European Open
WTA Swiss Open
1989 in Swiss tennis
1989 in Swiss women's sport